This is a list of universities in Liberia. As of 2018, Liberia had a total of 38 government recognized universities and colleges that confer baccalaureate degrees or higher.  In addition, as of 2010, there were 14 community colleges that were recognized by the National Commission on Higher Education.

Unaccredited universities operating illegally in Liberia have been occasionally shut down by the government. This list only includes accredited schools.

Recognized schools

Public
Liberia has three public universities. 
University of Liberia, Monrovia, Montserrado County (17,620 students as of 2009)
William V. S. Tubman University, Cape Palmas, Maryland County, formerly William V.S. Tubman College of Technology (288 students as of 2009)cepres international University, Gbanga Bong county.
Nimba University, formerly called Nimba County Community College (2,000 students as of 2022)

Private
The Liberian education authority distinguishes between private and faith-based universities.
A.M.E. Zion University, Monrovia
United Methodist University, Monrovia, Montserrado County (3,118 students as of 2009)
Adventist University of West Africa,  Marshall, Margibi County
African Bible College University, Yekepa, Nimba County (65 students as of 2009)
African Methodist Episcopal University, Montserrado County (3,432 students as of 2009)
African Methodist Episcopal Zion University, Montserrado County (2,325 students as of 2009)
Barshell University, Paynesville, Montserrado County
Baptist College of Missionary Physician Assistants
BlueCrest University College Liberia, Sinkor Road, Montserrado Country
Bushrod College of Science & Technology
CENSIL College, Paynesville, Liberia, Montserrado County
Cuttington University, Suacoco, Bong County, oldest private and coeducation university in Africa (2,287 students as of 2009)
Free Pentecostal College (FPC)
Hill City University of Science & Technology
Liberia Assemblies of God Bible College (LAGBC)
Liberia Baptist Theological Seminary
Liberia International Christian College, Ganta, Nimba County
Monrovia Bible College
Notre Dame University College of Liberia
The Salvation Army Polytechnic(T-SAP)
Smythe Institute of Management and Technology, Monrovia, Montserrado County
Starz University, Monrovia, Montserrado County
Stella Maris Polytechnic, Monrovia, Montserrado County (2,090 students as of 2009)
Trinity Bible College
Wesleyan College

Others

Booker Washington Institute, Kakata

References

 
Universities
Liberia
Liberia